Philippa of Luxembourg (1252 – 6 April 1311) was the daughter of Count Henry V of Luxembourg and his wife, Marguerite of Bar. She married John II, Count of Holland. Two of her granddaughters were Queen Philippa of England, and Margaret II, Countess of Hainault in her own right and wife of Holy Roman Emperor Louis IV.

The children of John II of Holland and Philippa of Luxembourg included:
 John (died 1302)
 Henry (died 1303), a canon in Cambrai 
 Simon
 William I, Count of Hainaut, father of Queen Philippa and Margaret II 
 John (Jean) (1288–1356), Seigneur de Beaumont. Married Marguerite, Countess of Soissons.
 Margaret (died 1342), wife of Robert II of Artois
 Alix (died 1317), wife of Roger Bigod, 5th Earl of Norfolk
 Isabelle (died 1305), wife of Raoul de Clermont, Seigneur de Nesle.
 Jeanne, nun at Fontenelles
 Mary of Avesnes (1280–1354), wife of Louis I, Duke of Bourbon
 Matilda, Abbess of Nivelles
 Willem de Cuser (born 1290, date of death unknown)

References

External links 
 Philippa de Luxembourg

1252 births
1311 deaths
Women of medieval Luxembourg
Countesses of Holland
Countesses of Hainaut
House of Limburg
Avesnes family